National Council was a local level of government in People's Republic of Poland. Introduced by Polish Constitution of 1952, they were elected for a term of office of 3 years in gminas, cities (and some districts), powiats and voivodships. National Councils had their own presidiums and were subordinate to higher-level National Councils.

They were meant to give the communist government a facade of democracy. In fact the elections were non-free, and National Councils had little autonomy, being almost completely dependent on decisions of Polish United Workers Party (PZPR).

The tasks of Voivodeship National Council were to managing the public life of the Voivodeship, social control over the activities of the Voivode and performing the functions of local self-government of the second instance. It was only the Act on the organization and scope of operation of national councils that specified the competences of councils by granting them legislative functions of local government, planning public activities, determining the budget and benefit plan, controlling the activities of state and local executive bodies, and appointing self-government executive bodies. The composition of national councils was determined on the basis of delegating their representatives by trade unions, workers 'and workers' unions, craft and agricultural organizations, cooperative unions, industrial, trade, cultural and educational organizations as well as 2 representatives of poviat national councils. National councils elected from their members a presidium consisting of a chairman, his deputy and 3 members.

See also 
Soviet (council)

References

Government of Poland
Polish People's Republic
Political history of Poland
Local government in Poland